The 1950 Oxford by-election was held on 2 November 1950 after the incumbent Conservative MP Quintin Hogg succeeded to the peerage.  The seat was retained by the Conservative candidate Lawrence Turner with an increased majority.

References

1950 elections in the United Kingdom
By-elections to the Parliament of the United Kingdom in Oxfordshire constituencies
1950 in England
Elections in Oxford
20th century in Oxford